Luke Warner Mizell (March 22, 1908 – October 2, 1962) was an American football player. He played at the halfback position for the Georgia Tech Yellow Jackets football team and was selected by the Associated Press, United Press, and Central Press as a second-team player on their 1928 College Football All-America Teams.  He also played in the National Football League (NFL) for the Frankford Yellow Jackets and Brooklyn Dodgers.

References

1908 births
1962 deaths
American football halfbacks
Brooklyn Dodgers (NFL) players
Frankford Yellow Jackets players
Georgia Tech Yellow Jackets football players
All-Southern college football players
Miami Senior High School alumni
Players of American football from Miami